Faith Erin Hicks is a Canadian cartoonist and animator living in Vancouver, British Columbia.

She has created a number of graphic novels, both as sole creator (such as Zombies Calling! and Friends with Boys) and as a collaborator (Nothing Could Possibly Go Wrong and Buffy: The High School Years), as well as serialized works like Demonology 101 and The Adventures of Superhero Girl.

Biography

After studying animation at Sheridan College, Faith Erin Hicks came to prominence with her long-running webcomic Demonology 101 (D101).

Since the beginning of Demonology 101, Hicks has completed a spinoff of the D101 character Sachs entitled A Distant Faith.  She also created a zombie-movie inspired comic called Zombies Calling, as well as the dystopian comic Ice (originally published on Modern Tales).

She drew backgrounds for the George of the Jungle animated series and created Jenny’s Brothers, a comic strip to the Halifax Chronicle-Herald. Her original comic series The Adventures of Superhero Girl ran weekly in Halifax's local free paper, The Coast, as well as on her own website. and was collected into a book by Dark Horse Comics.

Her graphic novel Friends with Boys was published in February 2012 from First Second. She was also the illustrator and co-writer for the graphic novel The Last of Us: American Dreams, along with Neil Druckmann.

On January 30, 2014, it was announced that Hicks would illustrate the first of two graphic novels written by young adult author Rainbow Rowell. This book would be published as Pumpkinheads on August 27, 2019.

On October 26, 2020, Hicks announced she was working on Ride On, her upcoming graphic novel, to be published by First Second.

Hicks has won two Eisner Awards. In 2014, she won for Best Publication for Kids for The Adventures of Superhero Girl. Then in 2019 Eisner Award for Best Publication for Kids (ages 9-12) for The Nameless City: The Divided Earth.

Bibliography

 Demonology 101 (webcomic, August 1999 – June 2004)
 Ice (webcomic, Modern Tales)
 Zombies Calling (graphic novel, Slave Labor Graphics, November 2007)
 The War at Ellsmere (graphic novel, Slave Labor Graphics, December 2008)
 One Year at Ellsmere (graphic novel reissue in full color with new lineart, First Second, July 7, 2020)
 Brain Camp, written by Susan Kim and Laurence Klavan (graphic novel, First Second, August 3, 2010)
 Friends with Boys (graphic novel, First Second Books, February 2012)
 Bigfoot Boy, written by J. Torres
 Into the Woods (graphic novel, Kids Can Press, September 1, 2012)
 The Unkindness of Ravens (graphic novel, Kids Can Press, September 1, 2013)
 The Sound of Thunder (graphic novel, Kids Can Press, September 1, 2014)
 The Adventures of Superhero Girl (graphic novel, Dark Horse, February 2013)
 Nothing Can Possibly Go Wrong, written by Prudence Shen (graphic novel, First Second, May 2013)
 The Last of Us: American Dreams, written by Neil Druckmann (graphic novel, Dark Horse, November 2013)
 The Nameless City Trilogy
 The Nameless City, colors by Jordie Bellaire (graphic novel, First Second, April 2016)
 The Stone Heart, colors by Jordie Bellaire (graphic novel, First Second, April 2017)
 The Divided Earth, colors by Jordie Bellaire (graphic novel, First Second, September 2018)
 Comics Will Break Your Heart (novel, Roaring Brook Press, February 2019)
 Pumpkinheads, written by Rainbow Rowell (graphic novel, First Second, August 2019)
 Avatar: The Last Airbender: Imbalance trilogy, art by Peter Wartman
 Part One, colors by Ryan Hill (graphic novel, Dark Horse, December 2018 )
 Part Two, colors by Adele Matera (graphic novel, Dark Horse, May 2019 )
 Part Three, colors by Adele Matera (graphic novel, Dark Horse, October 2019 )
 Avatar: The Last Airbender: Katara and the Pirate's Silver, art by Peter Wartman, colors by Adele Matera (graphic novel, Dark Horse, October 2020 )
Avatar: The Last Airbender: Toph Beifong's Metalbending Academy, art by Peter Wartman, colors by Adele Matera (graphic novel, Dark Horse, February 2021 )
Ride On (graphic novel, First Second, forthcoming August 2022 )

Awards

2003: Web Cartoonists' Choice Awards, for Demonology 101:
 Won "Outstanding Writing" Award
 Won "Outstanding Black and White Art" Award
 Nominated for "Outstanding Art" Award
 Nominated for "Outstanding Character Development" Award
 Nominated for "Outstanding Long Form Comic" Award
 Nominated for "Outstanding Dramatic Comic" Award
2004: Web Cartoonists' Choice Awards, for Demonology 101:
 Won "Outstanding Dramatic Comic" Award
 Won "Outstanding Long Form Comic" Award
2008, for Zombies Calling:
 Won the "Favourite Canadian Comic Book Creator - English-Language Publications" Joe Shuster Award
 Nominated for the "Outstanding Canadian Comic Book Cartoonist (Writer/Artist)" Joe Shuster Award
2014:
 Won the "2014 Will Eisner Comic Industry Award - Best Publication for Kids" for The Adventures of Superhero Girl
Nominated twice the 2013 Shuster Awards both in the category The Dragon Award (Comics for Kids). One nomination was for her solo effort The Adventures of Superhero Girl, and the other was for her collaboration with J. Bone, Bigfoot Boy volume 2.
2019, for The Nameless City: The Divided Earth:
 Won the "2019 Will Eisner Comic Industry Award - Best Publication for Kids"

References

Other sources

Faith Erin Hicks at Lambiek

External links
 
 

Year of birth missing (living people)
Artists from Vancouver
Canadian animators
Canadian comics artists
Canadian comics writers
Canadian graphic novelists
Canadian female comics artists
Female comics writers
Sheridan College animation program alumni
Canadian women animators
Writers from Vancouver
Living people
Place of birth missing (living people)